Finding Neverland is a 2004 biographical fantasy film directed by Marc Forster and written by David Magee, based on the 1998 play The Man Who Was Peter Pan by Allan Knee. The film is about playwright J. M. Barrie and his relationship with a family who inspired him to create Peter Pan. The film earned seven nominations at the 77th Academy Awards, including Best Picture, Best Adapted Screenplay, and Best Actor for Johnny Depp, and won for Best Original Score. The film was the inspiration for the stage musical of the same name in 2012.

Plot
In 1903, following the dismal reception of his latest play, Little Mary, Sir James Matthew Barrie meets the widowed Sylvia and her four young sons (George, Jack, Peter and Michael) in Kensington Gardens, and a strong, close friendship develops among them. He proves to be a great playmate and surrogate father figure for the boys, and their imaginative antics give him ideas which he incorporates into a play about boys who do not want to grow up, especially one named after troubled young Peter Llewelyn Davies. 

Although Barrie sees this family as wonderful and inspirational, people question his relationship with the Llewelyn Davies family. Sylvia was a widow: her husband died from cancer and left her with four boys to bring up on her own. Barrie's wife Mary, who eventually divorces him, and Sylvia's mother Emma du Maurier, object to the amount of time Barrie spends with the Llewelyn Davies family. Emma also seeks to control her daughter and grandsons, especially as Sylvia becomes increasingly weak from an unidentified illness. 

Along the way, Barrie goes on adventures with Sylvia and her boys. He too is a boy at heart and spending time with the family is special. Barrie takes those adventures he has with the boys and makes them into a play called Peter Pan.

Producer Charles Frohman skeptically agrees to mount Peter Pan, despite his belief that it holds no appeal for upper-class theatergoers. Barrie peppers the opening night audience with children from a nearby orphanage, and the adults present react to their infectious delight with an appreciation of their own. 

The play proves to be a huge success. Barrie is all set for his play, but when Peter arrives alone to the play, he goes to Sylvia's house to check up on her, and misses the show. Peter attends the play and realises the play is about his brothers and Barrie.

Sylvia is too ill to attend the premiere, so Barrie arranges to have an abridged production of it performed in her home. He gets the actors, props and musicians together in the Llewelyn Davies house. At the end of the play, Peter Pan points to the back doors and implies that Sylvia should go off to Neverland. She takes the hands of her boys and slowly walks out into Neverland. The living room and back garden transform into Neverland and Sylvia continues to walk on her own.

In the next scene, everyone is at Sylvia's funeral. Barrie discovers that her will says that he and her mother should look after the boys, an arrangement agreeable to both. The film ends with J. M. Barrie comforting Peter on the bench in the park where they first met.

Cast

In addition to Johnny Depp as Barrie and Kate Winslet as Sylvia Llewelyn Davies, the film stars Dustin Hoffman as producer Charles Frohman, Julie Christie as Sylvia's mother Emma du Maurier and Radha Mitchell (who had starred in Forster's Everything Put Together) as Barrie's ex wife Mary. Hoffman had appeared a dozen years earlier in the title role of the Peter Pan sequel Hook (1991). The original screenplay for this film included a scene in which his character – the play's sceptical producer – was to put on the Captain Hook costume and read some of his lines to point out how silly he found it. Hoffman objected to this, so the scene was rewritten for him to simply read aloud and ridicule character names from the play.

The Llewelyn Davies boys are portrayed by Freddie Highmore (Peter), Nick Roud (George), Joe Prospero (Jack) and Luke Spill (Michael). Highmore's performance in this film led Johnny Depp to suggest him to Tim Burton for Charlie and the Chocolate Factory, in which Highmore played Charlie Bucket and Depp played Willy Wonka. Ian Hart appears as Barrie's friend Arthur Conan Doyle. Oliver Fox plays Mary's lover Gilbert Cannan.

Within the film are scenes of a production of the play, featuring Kelly Macdonald as "Peter Pan", Angus Barnett as "Nana", Toby Jones as "Smee", Kate Maberly as "Wendy Darling", Matt Green as "John Darling", Catrin Rhys as "Michael Darling", Tim Potter as "Captain Hook"/"George Darling" and Jane Booker as "Mary Darling". Mackenzie Crook plays Mr. Jaspers, the theatre usher. Paul Whitehouse plays the stage manager. Eileen Essell, 82 years old at the time, makes one of her first feature film appearances, as Mrs. Snow, an elderly friend and fan of Barrie's. Like Highmore, she also followed Depp to a role in Charlie and the Chocolate Factory. Jimmy Gardner plays her husband.

Production
Finding Neverland was originally scheduled to be released in the autumn of 2003. Universal Pictures, which owned the film rights to Barrie's original play and was adapting it for cinema release the same year, refused to allow Miramax to use scenes from the play in Finding Neverland if it were released during the same year. Miramax agreed to delay the release in exchange for the rights to reproduce scenes from the stage production within the film. Finding Neverland opened in 2004, 100 years after Barrie's play opened.

Richmond Theatre in Richmond upon Thames doubled as the Duke of York's Theatre – the venue in which Peter Pan was first presented. Exterior scenes were filmed in Hyde Park, Brompton Cemetery and Kensington Gardens. According to commentary on the DVD release, the structure used as Barrie's summer cottage was located near Kent. Interiors were filmed in the Pinewood Studios in Buckinghamshire and the Shepperton Studios in Surrey.

Filming happened in various places in the UK. Production shot a short fantasy sequence at the Laredo Wild West Town in Kent. The town features in multiple fantasy playing sessions set in the Wild West, when Barrie (Johnny Depp) plays with the Llewellyn Davies boys.

Soundtrack

Release
The film premiered at the Venice Film Festival. It was shown at the Telluride Film Festival, the Haifa Film Festival, the Athens Panorama European Film Festival, the Mill Valley Film Festival, the Chicago International Film Festival and the Leeds International Film Festival before opening in the UK on 29 October 2004.

It had a limited release in the United States on November 12, 2004, and opened more widely on November 24, 2004.

Reception

Box office
The film was budgeted at $25 million. It grossed $51,676,606 in the US and $63 million in foreign markets for a total worldwide box office of $115,036,108.

Critical reception

On the review aggregation website Rotten Tomatoes, the film has an approval rating of 83% based on 208 reviews, with an average rating of 7.47/10. The website's critical consensus states, "It won't pass muster for those looking for historical accuracy, but Finding Neverland is a warm, heartfelt drama with a charm all its own -- and Johnny Depp gives a graceful performance as Peter Pan creator J.M. Barrie". Metacritic assigned the film a weighted average score of 67 out of 100, based on 38 critics, indicating "generally favorable reviews". Audiences polled by CinemaScore gave the film an average grade of "A" on an A+ to F scale.

In her review in The Times, Wendy Ide called the film "charming but rather idiosyncratic" and added, "A mixture of domestic drama, tragedy and exuberant fantasy, the film blends moist-eyed nostalgia with the cruel disappointments of a marriage break-up; a childlike playfulness and unpredictability with a portrait of a treacherously unforgiving and rigid Edwardian society. It could appeal to everyone from preteens to pensioners, or it could appeal to no one at all. Ultimately this unconventionality is probably one of the film’s main strengths. And if the tone veers a little haphazardly between fantasy and cold, hard reality, well, perhaps that is the most effective way of taking us into the mind of the film's mercurial protagonist."

Manohla Dargis of The New York Times said it "is the kind of film where even the smallest crack has been sealed. Instead of real quirks, strange habits, moments of everyday gas, gurgle and grunting, movies like this give us sumptuous production design, meticulous costumes and stories meant to leave us dewy-eyed and thoughtful, if never actually disturbed… The problem isn't the liberties the filmmakers take with reality, but that this isn't an engaging bowdlerization… Johnny Depp neither soars nor crashes, but moseys forward with vague purpose and actorly restraint… [he] and Ms. Winslet are pleasant to watch, as are the actors who play the Davies boys, but they haven't been pushed to their limits."

In the San Francisco Chronicle, Mick LaSalle observed the film "ends so beautifully, so poignantly and so aptly that there's a big temptation to forget that most of what precedes the ending is tiresome drivel, that Johnny Depp's performance… is precious and uninsightful, and that almost all the movie's magic derives directly from scenes lifted from Barrie's play. Winslet's no-nonsense strength is especially appreciated… Another actress would have followed Depp into the quicksand of faux-poetic self-indulgence. But Winslet is direct, grounded and heartfelt in a recognizably human way. Dustin Hoffman, as Barrie's producer, also steers clear of Depp's rhythms, though he has trouble deciding whether the producer is British or American."

Peter Travers of Rolling Stone rated the film 3½ out of a possible four stars and called it "glorious entertainment… magical, not mush." About Depp he said, "It's too early to speculate on how [he] will grow as an actor. Based on Finding Neverland, it's not too early to call him a great one."

In the St. Petersburg Times, Steve Persall graded the film B and commented, "A first viewing of Finding Neverland was tear-inducing and completely satisfying. Seeing it again was a mistake, less of my own than Forster's, who didn't make a movie that can sustain its magic beyond first impressions. Problems with David Magee's screenplay that initially could be shrugged off—occasionally slow pacing, melodramatic plot twists—became glaring. With familiarity, the fantasy simply wasn't as fanciful. It felt like growing up, and it was disappointing. On the other hand, many of the film's qualities are too strong to falter, starting with another fascinating man-child performance by Johnny Depp as Barrie."

Carina Chocano of the Los Angeles Times described the film as "gently seductive, genuinely tender and often moving without being maudlin" and added, "Depp and Winslet share a rare combination of airiness, earthiness and sharp, wry intelligence."

Accolades

In other media

Theatre

On February 6, 2011, La Jolla Playhouse, California, announced that they would produce a new stage musical based on the film with the book by Allan Knee, score by Scott Frankel and Michael Korie, and directed and choreographed by Rob Ashford. A planned production at La Jolla Playhouse was not held. A developmental reading was held in New York on March 31, 2011, with Julian Ovenden, Kelli O'Hara, Tony Roberts, Mary Beth Peil, Michael Cumpsty, and Meredith Patterson, directed by Ashford.
The adaptation had its world premiere on 22 September 2012 at Curve in Leicester. Directed by Rob Ashford, it stars Julian Ovenden as J.M Barrie and West End actress Rosalie Craig as Sylvia Llewelyn Davies.

On August 14, 2014, it was announced that the show would transfer to Broadway in March 2015. The show played at the Lunt-Fontanne Theatre. On 10 November 2014 it was announced that Tony, Emmy and Golden Globe-nominee Matthew Morrison would take Jordan's place in the portrayal of J. M. Barrie in the production's spring 2015 move to Broadway. Kelsey Grammer starred as Charles Frohman and Laura Michelle Kelly will again play the role of Sylvia Llewelyn Davies.

References

External links

 
 
 
 

2004 films
2004 biographical drama films
American biographical drama films
Biographical films about writers
Drama films based on actual events
American films based on plays
Films directed by Marc Forster
Films scored by Jan A. P. Kaczmarek
Films set in London
Films set in the 1890s
Films set in the 1900s
Films set in 1903
Films set in the 1910s
Films shot in London
Films shot in Surrey
Films that won the Best Original Score Academy Award
Llewelyn Davies family
Cultural depictions of J. M. Barrie
Cultural depictions of Arthur Conan Doyle
Films shot at Pinewood Studios
British biographical drama films
2004 drama films
American children's drama films
Miramax films
Peter Pan films
2000s English-language films
2000s American films
2000s British films